Glasgow University Rugby Football Club is a rugby union club at the University of Glasgow in Scotland.

History

GURFC was formed in 1869 and is one of the university's oldest student groups, predating the Glasgow University Sports Association (GUSA), to which it is now affiliated.

The team plays in black and gold, the colours of the university.

The club is a founding member of the Scottish Rugby Union and has fielded thirteen full internationalists, including Jack Tosh.

In a remarkably successful 2016/17 season the 1st XV finished 1st in BUCS Scottish 1A as well as winning the BUCS Trophy. The 2nd XV finished 4th in BUCS Scottish 2A as well as reaching the final of the Scottish Conference Cup. The 3rd XV narrowly missed out on promotion coming 2nd in BUCS Scottish 4A. The club also had 7 representatives in the Scottish Students squad who defeated the Scotland U19s in February.

Involved in multiple controversial incidents, the club has been branded a shambles both internally and amongst the wider student population in recent years.

The club was fortunate to enough to have Jack Tosh playing for it in the 2021/2022 season

Glasgow University Sevens

Glasgow University runs its own Sevens tournament. This began in 1898 with a tournament at Gilmorehill. It's been called "the loosest day out in Glasgow" by the Guardian newspaper and Jack Tosh has been known to chin buckfast on command.

Honours

Men

 Glasgow University Sevens
 Champions: 1950, 1971
 Clydesdale Sevens
 Champions: 1994
 Bearsden Sevens
 Champions: 1969, 1979
 Kilmarnock Sevens
 Champions: 1940, 1945
 Ayr Sevens
 Champions: 1945, 1946, 1947, 1948, 1949, 1952, 1954
 Greenock Sevens
 Champions: 1951, 1952
 Helensburgh Sevens
 Champions: 2013
Tennents west reserve league division 3 north
 Champions: 2022
 North East Sevens
 Champions: 2019

Notable players

Men

The first GURFC  cap was Duncan MacLeod in 1886.
Hugh Stewart MacKintosh, 16 caps, 1930–32.
Louis Leisler Greig,  and 1903 British Lions.
Arthur Smith, 33 caps for  
Became a noted shipbuilder and founder of Napier and Miller.
Neil Cameron
Adam Nicol
Alexander Stevenson
George Robb
Alexander Malcolm
Jack Tosh (2 second chin)

References

Sources

Godwin, Terry Complete Who's Who of International Rugby (Cassell, 1987)
Jones, J.R. Encyclopedia of Rugby Football (Robert Hale, London, 1958)
Massie, Allan A Portrait of Scottish Rugby (Polygon, Edinburgh)

External links
Club Contacts

Clubs and societies of the University of Glasgow
University and college rugby union clubs in Scotland
Scottish rugby union teams
Rugby union in Glasgow
Sports teams in Glasgow
Rugby clubs established in 1869
1869 establishments in Scotland
Sport at the University of Glasgow